Curtis John Leskanic (born April 2, 1968) is an American former Major League Baseball relief pitcher. During a 12-year baseball career, he pitched from 1993 to 2004 for the Colorado Rockies, Milwaukee Brewers, Kansas City Royals and Boston Red Sox. He is currently a professional scout for the Red Sox.

Career
Leskanic was drafted in the eighth round of the 1989 baseball amateur entry draft out of Louisiana State University by the Cleveland Indians, but was traded in 1992 to the Minnesota Twins with Oscar Múñoz for Paul Sorrento. Later that same year, he was drafted by the Colorado Rockies in the 1992 Expansion Draft. In 1993, he made his major league debut with the Rockies.

In 2004, during the Kansas City Royals' disastrous 58–104 season, he was released on June 18. On June 22, he was picked up by the Boston Red Sox and then made three appearances during the 2004 ALCS against the New York Yankees and was credited with the Game 4 win. His  innings of shutout baseball during Game 4 were the last he would ever throw; he retired following the 2004 season. He did make a return to Fenway Park for Opening Day 2005; there he received his World Series ring, as well as a large ovation. For Opening Day 2008, he got to carry out the World Series trophy.

Leskanic was a Little League coach in Florida and a scouting consultant for Boston before joining the Red Sox professional scouting staff for the 2008 season.

Personal life
Leskanic has a son, Brandon, and two daughters, Chloe and Chandler.

See also

 List of Colorado Rockies team records

References

External links

1968 births
Living people
Major League Baseball pitchers
Baseball players from Pennsylvania
Boston Red Sox players
Kansas City Royals players
Colorado Rockies players
Milwaukee Brewers players
People from Homestead, Pennsylvania
LSU Tigers baseball players
Kinston Indians players
Orlando Sun Rays players
Portland Beavers players
Wichita Wranglers players
Colorado Springs Sky Sox players
Salem Avalanche players
Huntsville Stars players
Indianapolis Indians players
Pawtucket Red Sox players
Boston Red Sox scouts
American people of Slovak descent